The following is a list of dams and their respective reservoirs on the North Platte River. The dams are listed in order from the river's headwaters to its meeting with the South Platte River.

Mainstream North Platte dams

North Platte River watershed